Reverend Jack Moore (June 24, 1905November 18, 1975) was an American minister and home builder from Shreveport, Louisiana. He was the founding pastor of Life Tabernacle Church, as well as a Director and key supporter to Full Gospel Business Men’s International.  He campaigned during the Healing Revival of the 1950s as a minister and manager for William Branham. He worked with and supported  Gordon Lindsay to produce the Voice of Healing magazine which subsequently transitioned into Christ for the Nations in 1971. The library at Christ for the Nations Institute, Jack Moore Hall, is named in his honor.

References

External links
Jack Moore Biography

1905 births
1975 deaths
20th-century Christian mystics
American faith healers
Christians from Louisiana
Converts to Christianity
Oneness Pentecostalism
Pentecostalism
Pentecostal theologians
People from Shreveport, Louisiana
American Pentecostal pastors
Protestant mystics